Yuan Yubai (born May 1956) is an admiral of the Chinese People's Liberation Army Navy (PLAN). He has been commander of the Southern Theater Command from January 2017 to June 2021 and formerly served as commander of the North Sea Fleet from 2014 to 2017.

Biography 
Yuan Yubai was born in 1956 in Gong'an County, Hubei Province. He graduated from Gong'an No. 2 High School in 1972 and PLAN Submarine Academy (Qingdao) in 1981.

Yuan has spent his entire military career up to 2017 in the North Sea Fleet. He served at the Qingdao Submarine Base after graduation from the submarine academy, rising to submarine captain by 1990. He was then promoted to chief of staff of the submarine base in 2004, and commander in 2007. He attained the rank of rear admiral in July 2008. He was appointed chief of staff of the North Sea Fleet in 2010, and deputy commander in 2013.

In July 2014, Yuan was promoted to commander of the North Sea Fleet, succeeding Qiu Yanpeng, who had been appointed chief of staff of the PLAN. In July 2015, Yuan and Qiu were both promoted to the rank of vice-admiral (zhong jiang).

In January 2017, Yuan was appointed commander of the Southern Theater Command, succeeding General Wang Jiaocheng. This was noted as a departure from the convention of having army officers serving as regional commanders. In July 2019, Yuan was promoted to the rank of admiral (shang jiang).

On 20 August 2021, he was appointed vice chairperson of the National People's Congress Social Development Affairs Committee.

References 

1956 births
Living people
People's Liberation Army generals from Hubei
People's Liberation Army Navy admirals
People from Jingzhou
Commanders of Southern Theater Command
Commanders of the North Sea Fleet